Benito Santiago Jr. (born June 22, 1989) is a Puerto Rican professional basketball player for Vaqueros de Bayamón in the Baloncesto Superior Nacional (BSN), the top tier basketball league in Puerto Rico. He played college basketball for Cumberlands. He is a former baseball player, just like his father.

Personal life 
Santiago is the son of former Major League Baseball player Benito Santiago.

Baseball career
Santiago was selected in the 31st round of the 2010 Major League Baseball draft by the Chicago Cubs.

References

External links 
 NBA D-League profile
 BSN Profile

1989 births
Living people
Atléticos de San Germán players
Basketball players at the 2019 Pan American Games
Cumberlands Patriots men's basketball players
Huracanes del Atlántico players
Immaculata-LaSalle High School alumni
Pan American Games medalists in basketball
Pan American Games silver medalists for Puerto Rico
People from Coamo, Puerto Rico
Medalists at the 2019 Pan American Games